Aleksandar Jončić (Serbian Cyrillic: Александар Јончић; 9 April 1935 – 27 March 2018) was a Serbian footballer.

Honours
Partizan
 Yugoslav First League: 1960–61, 1961–62, 1962–63
 Yugoslav Cup: 1957

References

1935 births
2018 deaths
People from Trstenik, Serbia
Yugoslav footballers
Serbian footballers
Association football defenders
Yugoslav First League players
Eredivisie players
FK Radnički Niš players
FK Partizan players
FK Spartak Subotica players
XerxesDZB players
Yugoslav expatriate footballers
Expatriate footballers in the Netherlands